Telmatobius peruvianus, also known as the Peru water frog, is a species of frog in the family Telmatobiidae. This semiaquatic frog is endemic to Andean highlands in southeastern Peru and far northern Chile where found  in streams and small rivers. It is threatened by habitat loss, pollution, collection for human consumption and infection by chytrid fungi, and it has not been seen in Chile since 1986.

References

peruvianus
Amphibians of the Andes
Amphibians of Chile
Amphibians of Peru
Taxonomy articles created by Polbot
Amphibians described in 1834